Dezak (also known as Deh-e Zak) is a village in Kiar-e Sharqi Rural District of the Central District of Kiar County, Chaharmahal and Bakhtiari province, Iran. At the 2006 census, its population was 3,133 in 775 households, when it was in Shahrekord County. The following census in 2011 counted 3,156 people in 886 households, by which time it was in the newly established Kiar County. The latest census in 2016 showed a population of 2,942 people in 881 households; it was the largest village in its rural district. The village is populated by Lurs.

References 

Kiar County

Populated places in Chaharmahal and Bakhtiari Province

Populated places in Kiar County

Luri settlements in Chaharmahal and Bakhtiari Province